Braya is a genus of plants in the family Brassicaceae.

Braya alpina Sternb. & Hoppe
Braya fernaldii Abbe
Braya forrestii W.W.Sm.
Braya glabella Richardson
Braya humilis (C.A. Mey.) B.L. Rob.
Braya linearis Rouy
Braya longii Fernald
Braya pilosa Hook.
Braya rosea (Turcz.) Bunge
Braya scharnhorstii Regel & Schmalh.
Braya thorild-wulffii Ostenf.

References

External links

 
Brassicaceae genera